beZ bileta is a Belarusian alternative rock band from Minsk active since 1998.

History
The group was formed in Minsk by Vitaly Artist in 1998. Having started with folk songs in Belarusian, by 2004, the band moved on to a more complex electronic and indie rock style.

beZ bileta have won the Rock Coronation Belarusian Music Award on several occasions, including in 2000 as "Discovery of the Year", "Song of the Year" in 2001 for their hit "My Motherland Belarus", and in 2009, where they received the main prize, the "Rock Crown", as well as prizes in the categories "Album of the Year" and "Video of the Year".

The band has performed at numerous festivals, both at home and abroad, including at Slavianski Bazaar in Vitebsk (Belarus), Basovišča (Poland), Fiesta Borealis (Poland—together with Hair Peace Salon and Jitters), Spirit of Woodstock (Italy), and Good-By (Germany).

At the Lira national music awards of 2012, presented by the Ministry of Culture of the Republic of Belarus and Capital TV, the band was honored in the category "Best Live Show".

Deadhead's Day
For several years, beZ bileta have organized Deadhead's Day, an event which features merchandise giveaways, mini concerts, a song remix contest for musicians from different countries, and a cover song contest. The winner of Deadhead's Day has a chance to perform onstage together with beZ bileta.

Vitaly Artist
The band's frontman, Vitaly Artist, has written music for various films and television productions, including the 2006 Russian action feature Piranha.

Band members
Current
 Vitaly Artist – vocals, acoustic guitar, production
 Alexander Ivashkevich – guitar
 Yan Weinstock

Past
 Denis Shurov – drums
 Yuri Rubanik – keyboards
 Alexander Gulyaev – bass guitar
 Pavel Kudrin
 Ivan Barzenka
 Sergey Bakovets
 Denis Sturchenko
 Ksenia Minchenko
 Alexander Myshkevich
 Pavel Mamonov
 Yan Yarosh
 Andrey Korotchenko
 Vladimir Razvodovsky
 Artemy Doronkin
 Yegor Doronkin

Discography
Studio albums

Literature

References

Belarusian musical groups